L'Atzúbia is a municipality in the comarca of Marina Alta in the north of the province of Alicante, in the Valencian Community, Spain.

It is enclaved in the Pego Valley. The neighbouring municipalities are: Vilallonga and Oliva to the north, Oliva and Pego to the east, La Vall de Gallinera and Vilallonga to the west;  and La Vall de Gallinera and Pego to the south.

References

External links
 Diputació d'Alacant - Unidad de Documentación 

Municipalities in the Province of Alicante
Marina Alta